Erick Neres da Cruz (born 24 August 1988) is a Brazilian professional footballer, who plays for Olhanense as a midfielder.

Career

Portugal
Born in Ilha Solteira, São Paulo, Erick played one season with Ituano Futebol Clube for one season before signing for G.D. Estoril Praia of the Segunda Liga in Portugal. While with Estoril, Erick played in 48 leagues matches while scoring 1 goal. During the 2011–12 season Erick helped Estoril to promotion to the Primeira Liga.

After the season ended Erick signed for Portimonense who also played in the Segunda Liga. During his only season with the club Erick scored 2 goals in 25 games as he helped the club to a sixth-place finish.

FC Dallas
On 5 July 2013 it was announced that Erick had signed with FC Dallas of Major League Soccer. The club declined the option on Erick after the season.

Harrisburg City Islanders
On 17 March 2015 it was announced that Erick had signed with Harrisburg City Islanders of United Soccer League.

Career statistics

Honors

Estoril
 Segunda Liga Champion (1): 2011–12

References

1988 births
Living people
People from Ilha Solteira
Liga Portugal 2 players
Association football midfielders
Expatriate footballers in Portugal
Expatriate soccer players in the United States
Brazilian footballers
Brazilian expatriate footballers
G.D. Estoril Praia players
Portimonense S.C. players
FC Dallas players
FC Zimbru Chișinău players
Expatriate footballers in Moldova
S.C. Farense players
Penn FC players
Major League Soccer players
USL Championship players
S.R. Almancilense players
Footballers from São Paulo (state)